Hellinsia gypsotes is a moth of the family Pterophoridae. It is found in China (Taishan).

References

Moths described in 1937
gypsotes
Moths of Asia